This is an incomplete list of microcredit lending social websites:

 Kiva (organization)
 United Prosperity (organisation)
 Wokai
 Energy in Common
 World Vision
 MicroPlace
 Zidisha

See also

References

Microcredit
Economics websites
Microcredit